Sneltvedt is a village located in the municipality of Skien, Norway, located east of Skien city. Its population according to (SSB 2005), is 234.

Sneltvedt is also a surname. According to SSB (Statistics Norway), about hundreds of people are named as "Sneltvedt" as their last name.

Villages in Vestfold og Telemark